John Cooke (1808 – 29 January 1841) was an English cricketer from Bristol who was associated with Oxford University Cricket Club and made his first-class debut in 1829.

References

1808 births
1841 deaths
English cricketers
English cricketers of 1826 to 1863
Oxford University cricketers
People educated at Winchester College
Alumni of Balliol College, Oxford